Suillus subluteus is a species of mushroom in the genus Suillus. First described as Boletus subluteus by Charles Horton Peck in 1887, it was transferred to Suillus by Wally Snell in 1944. It is found in North America.

References

External links

subluteus
Fungi of North America
Edible fungi
Fungi described in 1887
Taxa named by Charles Horton Peck